Grown Ups was an American emo band from Chicago, Illinois and Furnessville, Indiana.

History
Their sound combined Emo and Screamo with Indie rock, Math rock and Pop punk. They released one full-length album, More Songs, under the London, Britain-based Big Scary Monsters label, later re-released by American label, Topshelf Records.

They have toured Europe and the United Kingdom.

They released "Hand Holder" EP/7" on Doghouse Records in 2011.

Doyle Martin went on to form the band Cloakroom, as well as play guitar in the band Nothing.

Members
 Jacob Bonham – drums
 Doyle Martin – vocals, guitar
 Adam Sheets – guitar
 Andy Tokarski – bass

Discography

Studio album
More Songs (Big Scary Monsters, Topshelf Records) (2010)

EPs
Songs (Kid Sister Everything) (2009)
Handholder (Doghouse Records) (2011)

Splits
Gotta Groove SXSW Promo 2011: Split with The Clippers, Empire! Empire! (I Was a Lonely Estate) (Count Your Lucky Stars, Topshelf Records) (2011)
Split with Brighter Arrows, Raw Nerve, Cloud Mouth (2011)

References

External links
Biography on Top Shelf Records website
Biography on Big Scary Monsters Recording Company's website.

Grown Ups on Myspace

American emo musical groups
Topshelf Records artists
Doghouse Records artists